Rock Creek Township, Kansas may refer to one of the following places:

 Rock Creek Township, Butler County, Kansas
 Rock Creek Township, Coffey County, Kansas
 Rock Creek Township, Cowley County, Kansas
 Rock Creek Township, Jefferson County, Kansas
 Rock Creek Township, Nemaha County, Kansas
 Rock Creek Township, Pottawatomie County, Kansas
 Rock Creek Township, Wabaunsee County, Kansas

See also 

Rock Creek Township (disambiguation)

Kansas township disambiguation pages